The Guatemala women's national volleyball team represents Guatemala in international women's volleyball competitions and friendly matches.

In late 2021, Guatemala competed in Central America's AFECAVOL (Asociación de Federaciones CentroAmericanas de Voleibol) zone.

Squad
2010 Central American and Caribbean Games
Head Coach: Leivys García

References

External links
NORCECA
2006 World Championship Qualifier
2010 World Championship Qualifier

Volleyball
National women's volleyball teams
Women's sport in Guatemala
Volleyball in Guatemala